Faillon may refer to:

Étienne-Michel Faillon (1799–1870), a French historian, Sulpician priest and teacher
Faillon Lake, on the Mégiscane River, in Quebec, Canada

See also
 Fallon (disambiguation)